In mathematics, the tensor bundle of a manifold is the direct sum of all tensor products of the tangent bundle and the cotangent bundle of that manifold. To do calculus on the tensor bundle a connection is needed, except for the special case of the exterior derivative of antisymmetric tensors.

Definition

A tensor bundle is a fiber bundle where the fiber is a tensor product of any number of copies of the tangent space and/or cotangent space of the base space, which is a manifold. As such, the fiber is a vector space and the tensor bundle is a special kind of vector bundle.

References

See also

 
 
 

Vector bundles